Vice Versa may refer to:

 Vice versa, a Latin phrase, 'the other way around'

Film
 Vice Versa (1916 film), a film adaptation of Thomas Anstey Guthrie's 1882 novel with the same name, starring Charles Rock
 Vice Versa (1948 film), the third film adaptation of Guthrie's novel, starring Roger Livesey
 Vice Versa (1988 film), the fourth film adaptation of Guthrie's novel, featuring Judge Reinhold

Literature
 Vice Versa (magazine), a publication for lesbians
 Vice Versa (novel), an 1882 novel by Thomas Anstey Guthrie
 Vice Versa (play), a play by Edward Rose, based on the novel
 Vice Versa: Bisexuality and the Eroticism of Everyday Life, a book by Marjorie Garber
Éditions Vice-Versa, a magazine at the centre of Aubry v Éditions Vice-Versa Inc, a leading Supreme Court of Canada case about Quebec privacy rights

Music
 Vice Versa (Funkstörung album), released in 2001
 Vice Versa (band), a band from Sheffield, England
 Vice Versa (Rauw Alejandro album), released in 2021
 Viceversa (Francesco Gabbani album), released in 2020
 "Viceversa" (song), the title track from the album
 Viceversa (Gilberto Santa Rosa album), released in 2002

See also
 Vice Versas, a 2011 type of chocolate produced by Nestlé
 Vice Verses, a 2011 alternative rock album by Switchfoot
 Vice (disambiguation)